Two-time defending champions Martina Navratilova and Pam Shriver defeated Larisa Savchenko and Natasha Zvereva in the final, 6–3, 6–4 to win the doubles tennis title at the 1988 Virginia Slims Championships. It was Navratilova's eleventh Tour Finals doubles title, and Shriver's eighth.

Seeds
Champion seeds are indicated in bold text while text in italics indicates the round in which those seeds were eliminated. The top two seeded teams received byes into the semifinals.

 Martina Navratilova /  Pam Shriver (champions)
 Claudia Kohde-Kilsch /  Helena Suková (semifinals)
 Steffi Graf /  Gabriela Sabatini (semifinals)
 Gigi Fernández /  Robin White (quarterfinals)

Draw

References
 1988 Virginia Slims Championships Doubles Draw

WTA Tour Championships
1988 WTA Tour